Brookhaven Academy (BA) is an independent, co-educational college preparatory school in Lincoln County, Mississippi, near Brookhaven. The school was founded in 1970 as a segregation academy.

History
In January 1970, the Fifth U.S. Circuit Court of Appeals ordered Mississippi to desegregate its public schools. Brookhaven Academy, Inc. was founded in 1970 as a segregation academy.

The IRS did not confer non-profit status to Brookhaven Academy Educational Foundation until 1983. In 1988, Black students walked out of nearby Brookhaven High School in protest when that school hired a coach from Brookhaven Academy, which was considered a grievous racial provocation. During the 2015-16 school year, Brookhaven Academy enrolled a single black child. In 2018, the school received attention when it was revealed that U.S. senatorial candidate Cindy Hyde-Smith sent her daughter to this school.

Student body

Racial distribution in 2015-16

Surrounding Lincoln County was about 30% Black.

Racial distribution in 2017-2018

Surrounding Lincoln County was about 82% white, 16% Black, and 2% Hispanic.

Sports
Brookhaven plays football in the MAIS 4A league.

Other boys' sports are archery, baseball, basketball, golf, soccer, and tennis. Girls' sports offered are archery, basketball, cheerleading, softball, soccer and tennis.

Notable alumni
Cameron Achord, football coach
Corey Dickerson, baseball player

See also

List of private schools in Mississippi
List of segregation academies in the US
List of segregation academies in Mississippi

References

External links 
 School website

Private high schools in Mississippi
Schools in Lincoln County, Mississippi
Segregation academies in Mississippi
Private middle schools in Mississippi
Private elementary schools in Mississippi
Preparatory schools in Mississippi
Educational institutions established in 1970
1970 establishments in Mississippi